This is a list of episodes for the animated television series Daniel Tiger's Neighborhood.

Series overview

Episodes

Season 1 (2012–14)

Season 2 (2014–16)

Season 3 (2016–18)

Season 4 (2018–20)

Season 5 (2020–22)

Season 6 (2022-2024)

References

Lists of American children's animated television series episodes
Lists of Canadian children's animated television series episodes